Adilson José da Silva (born 24 January 1972) is a Brazilian professional golfer. He currently plays on the Southern Africa-based Sunshine Tour, where he has won twelve times.

Career
Da Silva was born in Santa Cruz do Sul, Brazil but later moved to KwaZulu-Natal, South Africa. He turned professional in 1994. Da Silva competes predominantly on the Southern Africa-based Sunshine Tour. He won his first title on the tour in 1997 and has since added eight more tournament victories, and led the Vodacom Swing Challenge standings in 2006. He holds the record for most consecutive cuts made on the Sunshine Tour with 43.

Da Silva has also played extensively in Zimbabwe, where he won the Amateur Championship in 1992. He competed on the Zimbabwean PGA Tour between 1996 and 2003, winning more than 30 titles and heading the Zimbabwean Order of Merit on five occasions.

Da Silva played in The Open Championship in 2000, 2007 and 2012. He made the cut in 2012, finishing in a tie for 69th.

In 2016, da Silva hit the opening tee shot in golf’s return to the Olympics.

Amateur wins
1990 Brazil Amateur Open Championship
1991 Brazil Amateur Open Championship
1992 Zimbabwe Amateur Championship
Phalaborwa Open

Professional wins (14)

Asian Tour wins (1)

Asian Tour playoff record (0–1)

Sunshine Tour wins (12)

Sunshine Tour playoff record (1–3)

European Senior Tour wins (1)

Results in major championships

Note: da Silva only played in The Open Championship.

CUT = missed the half-way cut
"T" = tied

Team appearances
Professional
World Cup (representing Brazil): 2011, 2013

References

External links
 
 
 
 
 
 
 
 
 Adilson José da Silva at the 2019 Pan American Games

Brazilian male golfers
Da Silva, Adilson
Olympic golfers of Brazil
Golfers at the 2016 Summer Olympics
Golfers at the 2015 Pan American Games
Golfers at the 2019 Pan American Games
Pan American Games competitors for Brazil
Sportspeople from Rio Grande do Sul
People from Santa Cruz do Sul
People from KwaZulu-Natal
1972 births
Living people